Killarney is a town in County Kerry, southwestern Ireland.

Killarney may also refer to:

Places

Australia
 Killarney, Queensland
 Killarney Station, Northern Territory
 Killarney, Victoria

Canada
 Killarney, Calgary
 Killarney, Edmonton
 Killarney, Manitoba
 Killarney, Ontario
 Killarney, Vancouver

South Africa
 Killarney, Johannesburg

United States
 Killarney, Florida
 Killarney, Georgia
 Killarney (Ferriday, Louisiana), a historic mansion

Zimbabwe 
 Killarney, Zimbabwe

Other uses
 USS Killarney (SP-219), a United States Navy patrol vessel in commission from 1917 to 1919
 Killarney Motor Racing Complex, in Cape Town, South Africa
 Killarney National Park, in Ireland
 Killarney Provincial Park in Ontario, Canada
 Killarney Secondary School, a public school in Vancouver, Canada
 Killarney, another name for Stollmeyer's Castle
 "Killarney", an 1857 song by Michael Balfe and Edmund Falconer

See also